Ilidža is a town and a municipality located in Sarajevo Canton of the Federation of Bosnia and Herzegovina, an entity of Bosnia and Herzegovina. It has a total population of 66,730 with 63,528 in Ilidža itself, and is a chief suburb of Sarajevo and de facto its neighborhood. It is best known for the Vrelo Bosne spring, as well as the natural environment of its surroundings and historical tradition dating back to Neolithic times. Sarajevo International Airport is located nearby.

Geography

Ilidža is known to have a pleasant and attractive geography. The town itself is built on fairly level ground, although it is surrounded by mountains. The biggest is Mount Igman, whose  peak towers above the town. On the mountain grows the "Golden Lily" (Lilium bosniacum), a branch of the Lily family of flowers that is a historical symbol of Bosnia. The area is rich in flint, especially in the Butmir neighborhood.

The Željeznica river, a tributary of the Bosna, passes through the town's center. The Bosna itself passes through Ilidža's outskirts. Its spring, Vrelo Bosne, is found a few kilometers to the west of the town centre and is a national park. A number of smaller streams also pass through the town's area.

A number of horticulture projects have been undertaken in the history of Ilidža. The town is today very rich in trees. The total area of the town's parks is about 50% of that of Sarajevo, which has six times its population. In 1894, an article in a London newspaper called Ilidža "One of the most beautiful places in the world".

Climate
Climate in this area has mild differences between highs and lows, and there is adequate rainfall year-round. The Köppen climate classification subtype for this climate is "Cfb" (Marine West Coast Climate/Oceanic climate).

History

Ilidža is one of the longest continuously inhabited regions in Bosnia and Herzegovina. Since the 19th century, numerous archeological finds have been made in the Butmir area, dating from Neolithic times. The so-called Butmir culture, is one of the best documented Neolithic cultures in Europe of the 26th and 25th centuries BC.

During Roman times, the Ilidža area was the location of the town known as Aquae Sulphurae. This was a Roman colony, and the largest settlement in the whole of Bosnia and Herzegovina at the time. Today numerous traces of Roman civilisation have been found, such as mosaics, ceramics, jewellery, coins, and even structural remains.

During the medieval period, the Ilidža area was part of the Bosnian province of Vrhbosna. Katera, one of the two original Bosnian towns mentioned by Constantine VII in De Administrando Imperio, was found on the ground of today's Ilidža municipality. The disciples of Saints Cyril and Methodius considered the area important enough to stop at Vrelo Bosne and build a church in the area.

The modern town of Ilidža as we know it was founded during the Ottoman rule of Bosnia. Its name derives from the Turkish word Ilıca, meaning "warm thermal springs". (Ilıca is also the name of a district of Erzurum, a southeast city of Turkey. There are also Ilıca-named municipalities in the following provinces of Turkey:  Samsun,
Kahramanmaraş, Antalya, Malatya, Ordu.) Numerous elements of Turkish culture found their way into Ilidža, such as a number of oriental homes from the 15th and 16th centuries that have survived to this day. Numerous mosques and bridges were also built at this time.

Ilidža, like the rest of Bosnia and Herzegovina, experienced industrialisation and westernization with the coming of Austria-Hungary. A railway station and tracks, hotels, and various other structures made Ilidža the most important town after Sarajevo in the region. This continued into the 1900s as Ilidža continued to grow and develop.

Before 1990, Ilidža was populated mainly by Serbs 47,21% and Bosniaks 31,58%. When the Bosnian War started in 1992, until the 1995 Dayton Agreement, the municipality was divided between Bosnian Muslims (Hrasnica, Sokolović Kolonija, Butmir) and Serb (Ilidža, Kotorac, Vojkovići, Grlica) parts. When, under the terms of the Dayton Agreement, Ilidža was placed within the territory of the Bosnian Federation, the vast majority of Serbs fled the town to live in Republika Srpska, destroying some buildings as they did so. In the process, NATO and EU observers reported about violence between those Serbs who decided to leave and ones who wanted to stay, as those who were leaving looted and set on fire not just their but also houses and property of those who were staying as well. From 1996, Ilidža was home to the headquarters of the NATO peacekeeping force IFOR (later SFOR and EUFOR) before its move to nearby Butmir in the year 2000. During this period, the hotels Terme, Srbija (Serbia), Bosna (Bosnia) and Jadran were barricaded and the area was used as NATO HQ. Today Ilidža remains a bustling, largely Bosniak-dominated town. Vojkovići and Grlica formed Eastern Ilidža Municipality which is dominated by Serbs.

Demographics
According to the 2013 census, the municipality had a population of 66,730 inhabitants, with 63,528 in Ilidža itself.

Settlements
The municipality consists of the following settlements with their respective populations:
Buhotina – 85
Jasen – 9
Kakrinje – 411
Kobiljača – 349
Krupac – 13
Rakovica – 1,836
Rudnik – 377
Sarajevo Dio - Ilidža – 63,528
Vela – 7
Vlakovo – 3
Zenik – 108
Zoranovići – 4

Ethnic composition

Government

Although a fully incorporated suburb of Sarajevo, Ilidža is its own municipality and thus has its own municipal government.

Municipal Assembly:

Party of Democratic Action – 11 members
People and Justice – 11 members
Independent – 4 members
Social Democratic Party – 2 members
Our Party – 2 members
People's European Union – 1 member

The current municipal mayor is Nermin Muzur, having served since 23 December 2020.

Economy
Prior to the war, Ilidža municipality was one of the five wealthiest in Bosnia and Herzegovina, and one of the ten wealthiest in the whole of Yugoslavia. The war had a devastating effect on the town's economy, but today it is slowly starting to recover. Several important local companies are based in Ilidža. The town's economy is based on food processing, electronics, and manufacturing.

Tourism
One of the most important parts of Ilidža's economy is its tourism. The natural environment of the area is used to the town's advantage, attracting tourists from both abroad and as near as neighboring Sarajevo. There are plans for future development to enhance tourism, including hotels and a cable railway line to mount Igman.

Sarajevo International Airport is located just a few kilometers from the town. The region's natural environment and historical sites are draws for tourists. Igman mountain is a destination for skiing and hiking, and Vrelo Bosne is one of the country's most popular parks. The Rimski Most ("Roman Bridge") over the Bosna river was built in the 16th century using actual Roman stones. Ilidža is marketed to Arab tourists, with many services advertised in Arabic.

Twin towns – sister cities

Ilidža is twinned with:
 Çekmeköy, Turkey
 İzmit, Turkey

References

External links

Official site

 

 
Populated places in the Sarajevo Canton
Protected areas of Bosnia and Herzegovina
Populated places in Ilidža